The Joseph Knoble Brewery is a historic beer brewery building at North 3rd and "E" Streets in Fort Smith, Arkansas.  Built in the early 1850s, it is a three-story stone building, with an extension beside that originally housed a large beer vault.  The main beer production facility was on the third floor, and the first floor originally housed a tavern.  The area beside the main building where the vault was located was eventually filled in, with a beer garden built on top of it.  It is the only known surviving example of a mid-19th century brewery in the state.

The building was listed on the National Register of Historic Places in 1972.  It now houses a restaurant.

See also
National Register of Historic Places listings in Sebastian County, Arkansas

References

Industrial buildings and structures on the National Register of Historic Places in Arkansas
Commercial buildings completed in 1851
Buildings and structures in Fort Smith, Arkansas
1851 establishments in Arkansas
National Register of Historic Places in Sebastian County, Arkansas